Joey Leigh "Jake" McCandless (c. 1930 – November 5, 2007) was an American football and basketball coach.  He served as the head football coach at Princeton University from 1969 to 1972, compiling a record of 18–17–1.  McCandless also served as acting head basketball coach for the final 15 games of the 1960–61 season, replacing an ailing Franklin Cappon, who suffered a heart attack in January 1961.  When Cappon died in November of that year, McCandless was named his successor and led the Princeton team for the 1961–62 season. A native of Beaver Falls, Pennsylvania, McCandless graduated from Beaver Falls High School in 1947. He attended Princeton, where he played college football before graduating in 1951. He began his coaching career at St. Mark's School in Southborough, Massachusetts and Kent School in Kent, Connecticut. He returned in Princeton  in 1958 as an assistant football coach.  McCandless died at the age of 77, at his home in Ocala, Florida, on November 5, 2007.

Head coaching record

College football

College basketball

Notes

References

Year of birth uncertain
2007 deaths
Princeton Tigers football coaches
Princeton Tigers football players
Princeton Tigers men's basketball coaches
High school basketball coaches in Connecticut
High school basketball coaches in Massachusetts
High school football coaches in Connecticut
High school football coaches in Massachusetts
People from Beaver Falls, Pennsylvania
Sportspeople from the Pittsburgh metropolitan area
Coaches of American football from Pennsylvania
Players of American football from Pennsylvania
Basketball coaches from Pennsylvania